General Sharp may refer to:

Alan G. Sharp (1929–2016), U.S. Air Force major general
Frederick Ralph Sharp (1915–1992), Royal Canadian Air Force general
Jacob H. Sharp (1833–1907), Confederate States Army brigadier general
John Sharp (British Army officer) (1917–1977), British Army general
Walter L. Sharp (born 1952), U.S. Army four-star general
William F. Sharp (1885–1947), U.S. Army major general

See also
Henry Granville Sharpe (1858–1947), U.S. Army major general
Matthew Sharpe (British Army officer) (1773–1845), British Army lieutenant general and post-retirement brevet general 
Attorney General Sharp (disambiguation)